Sadiq Aman Khan    (born 8 October 1970) is a British politician serving as Mayor of London since 2016. He was previously Member of Parliament (MP) for Tooting from 2005 until 2016. A member of the Labour Party, Khan is on the party's soft left and has been ideologically characterised as a social democrat.

Born in Tooting, South London, to a British Pakistani family, Khan earned a law degree from the University of North London. He subsequently worked as a solicitor specialising in human rights issues and chaired the Liberty advocacy group for three years. Joining the Labour Party, Khan was a councillor for the London Borough of Wandsworth from 1994 to 2006 before being elected MP for Tooting at the 2005 general election. He was openly critical of several policies of Labour Prime Minister Tony Blair, including the 2003 invasion of Iraq and new anti-terror legislation. Under Blair's successor Gordon Brown, Khan was appointed Parliamentary Under-Secretary of State for Communities and Local Government in 2008, later becoming Minister of State for Transport. A key ally of the next Labour leader, Ed Miliband, he served in Miliband's Shadow Cabinet as Shadow Secretary of State for Justice, Shadow Lord Chancellor and Shadow Minister for London. 

Khan was elected Mayor of London at the 2016 mayoral election, defeating the Conservative candidate Zac Goldsmith, and resigned as an MP. As Mayor, he implemented the Hopper fare for unlimited bus and tram journeys for an hour, increased the cost and the area covered by the London congestion charge, and introduced new charges (the ULEZ and the T-Charge) for older and more polluting vehicles driving in the city. He also backed expansion at London City Airport and Gatwick Airport. He was a vocal supporter of the unsuccessful Britain Stronger in Europe and People's Vote campaigns for the UK to remain in the European Union, and attracted international attention for his Twitter arguments with United States President Donald Trump. Khan established the Commission for Diversity in the Public Realm following the 2020 George Floyd protests. Although Khan initially froze some Transport for London (TfL) fares, he has implemented transport fare rises since 2021 in return for a £1.6 billion bailout from the UK Government during the COVID-19 pandemic, and also lobbied the government to introduce public health restrictions on several occasions throughout the pandemic. He was re-elected as Mayor in May 2021.

He was included in the 2018 Time 100 list of most influential people in the world. Khan has been praised for making London's transport more accessible and reducing the number of polluting vehicles in central London.

Early life
Sadiq Aman Khan was born on 8 October 1970 at St George's Hospital in Tooting, South London to a working-class Sunni Muslim-Muhajir family. His grandparents migrated from Lucknow in United Provinces, British India to Pakistan following the partition of India in 1947.
His father Amanullah and mother Sehrun arrived in London from Pakistan in 1968. Khan was the fifth of eight children, seven of whom were boys. In London, Amanullah worked as a bus driver and Sehrun as a seamstress.

Khan and his siblings grew up in a three-bedroom council flat on the Henry Prince Estate in Earlsfield. He attended Fircroft Primary School and then Ernest Bevin School, a local comprehensive. Khan studied science and mathematics at A-level, in the hope of eventually becoming a dentist. A teacher recommended that he read law instead, as he had an argumentative personality. The teacher's suggestion, along with the American television programme L.A. Law, inspired Khan to do so. He read Law at the University of North London (now London Metropolitan University). His parents later moved out of their council flat and purchased their own home. Like his brothers, Khan was a fan of sport, particularly enjoying football, cricket, and boxing.

From his earliest years, Khan worked: "I was surrounded by my mum and dad working all the time, so as soon as I could get a job, I got a job. I got a paper round, a Saturday job—some summers I laboured on a building site." The family continues to send money to relatives in Pakistan, "because we're blessed being in this country." He and his family often encountered racism, which led to him and his brothers taking up boxing at the Earlsfield Amateur Boxing Club. While studying for his degree, between the ages of 18 and 21, he had a Saturday job at the Peter Jones department store in Sloane Square.

Legal career
Before entering the House of Commons in 2005, Khan practised as a solicitor.
After completing his law degree in 1991, Khan took his Law Society finals at the College of Law in Guildford. In 1994 he married Saadiya Ahmed, who was also a solicitor.

Also in 1994, Khan became a trainee solicitor at a firm of solicitors called Christian Fisher; the firm undertook mainly legal aid cases. The partners were Michael Fisher and Louise Christian. Khan became a partner at the firm in 1997, and like Christian, specialised in human rights law. When Fisher left in 2002, the firm was renamed Christian Khan. Khan left the firm in 2004, after he became the prospective Labour candidate for the Tooting parliamentary constituency.

During his legal career, he acted in actions against employment and discrimination law, judicial reviews, inquests, the police, and crime, and was involved in cases including the following:
 Bubbins vs The United Kingdom (European Court of Human Rights – shooting of an unarmed individual by police marksmen)
 HSU and Thompson v Met Police (wrongful arrest/police damages)
 Reeves v Met Police (duty of care to prisoners)
 Murray v CAB (discrimination)
 Ahmed v University of Oxford (racial discrimination against a student)
 Dr Jadhav v Secretary of State for Health (racial discrimination in the employment of Indian doctors by the health service)
 CI Logan v Met Police (racial discrimination)
 Supt Dizaei v Met Police (police damages, discrimination)
 Inquest into the death of David Rocky Bennett (use of restraints)
 Lead solicitor on Mayday demonstration 2001 test case litigation (Human Rights Act)
 Farrakhan v Home Secretary (Human Rights Act): in 2001, Khan represented the American Nation of Islam leader Louis Farrakhan in the High Court and overturned a ban on him entering the United Kingdom, first imposed in 1986. The government subsequently won on appeal.
 In February 2000, Khan represented a group of Kurdish actors who were arrested by Metropolitan Police during a rehearsal of the Harold Pinter play Mountain Language, securing £150,000 in damages for the group for their wrongful arrest and the trauma caused by the arrest.
 McDowell and Taylor v Met Police: Leroy McDowell and Wayne Taylor successfully sued the Metropolitan Police for assault and false imprisonment.
 Represented Maajid Nawaz, Reza Pankhurst and Ian Nisbet in Egyptian court when they were arrested on charges of trying to revive Hizb ut-Tahrir.

Parliamentary career

First term: 2005–2010

Before entering Parliament, Khan represented Tooting as a councillor on Wandsworth Council from 1994 to 2006, and was granted the title of Honorary Alderman of Wandsworth upon his retirement from local politics.

In 2003, Tooting Constituency Labour Party decided to open its parliamentary selection to all interested candidates, including the incumbent MP since 1974, Tom Cox. This prompted Cox, then in his mid-70s, to announce his retirement rather than risk de-selection. In the subsequent selection contest, Khan defeated five other local candidates to become Labour's candidate for the seat. He was elected to Parliament at the 2005 general election.

Khan was one of the Labour MPs who led the successful opposition to Prime Minister Tony Blair's proposed introduction of 90 days' detention without charge for those suspected of terrorism offences. In recognition of this, The Spectator—a right-wing magazine then edited by Boris Johnson—awarded him the "Newcomer of the Year Award" at the 2005 Parliamentarian of the Year Awards. The magazine's editorial board stated that he had received the award "for the tough-mindedness and clarity with which he has spoken about the very difficult issues of Islamic terror". 

In August 2006, two days after seven terrorists were arrested for attempting the 2006 transatlantic aircraft plot Khan signed an open letter to Tony Blair that was signed by prominent Muslims and published in The Guardian. The letter criticised UK foreign policy and in particular the 2003 invasion of Iraq, stating that Blair's policies had caused great harm to civilians in the Middle East and provided "ammunition to extremists who threaten us all". In interviews with the BBC, Labour Home Secretary John Reid - who had coordinated the arrests - described the letter as "a dreadful misjudgement", and former Conservative leader Michael Howard described it as "a form of blackmail".

Khan had to repay £500 in expenses in 2007 in relation to a newsletter sent to constituents featuring a "Labour rose", which was deemed to be unduly prominent. While the content of the newsletter was not deemed to be party political, the rose logo was found to be unduly prominent which may have had the effect of promoting a political party. There was no suggestion that Khan had deliberately or dishonestly compiled his expenses claims, which were not explicitly disallowed under the rules at that time. The rules were retrospectively changed disallowing the claim, which had previously been approved by the House of Commons authorities.

On 3 February 2008, The Sunday Times claimed that a conversation between Khan and prisoner Babar Ahmad – a constituent accused of involvement in terrorism – at Woodhill Prison in Milton Keynes had been bugged by the Metropolitan Police Anti-Terrorist Branch. An inquiry was launched by the Justice Secretary, Jack Straw. There was concern that the bugging contravened the Wilson Doctrine that police should not bug MPs. The report concluded that the doctrine did not apply because it affected only bugging requiring approval by the Home Secretary, while in Khan's case the monitoring was authorised by a senior police officer.  The Home Secretary, Jacqui Smith, then announced a further policy review and said the bugging of discussions between MPs and their constituents should be banned.

In June 2007, Blair stood down as both Prime Minister and Labour Party leader, to be replaced by Gordon Brown. Brown thought highly of Khan, who moved up the parliamentary ranks under Brown's Premiership. Brown made Khan a party whip, who was therefore charged with ensuring that Labour-sponsored legislation made it through the parliamentary process to become law. In July 2008, Khan helped push through a government proposal to permit the detention of those suspected of terror offences for 42 days without charge. For his part in this, Khan was criticised by Liberty's Shami Chakrabarti and others, who claimed that Khan had contravened his principles on civil liberties issues.

On Prime Minister Gordon Brown's Cabinet reshuffle of 3 October 2008, Khan was appointed Parliamentary Under-Secretary of State for Communities and Local Government.

In 2008, the Fabian Society published Khan's book, Fairness Not Favours. In this work, Khan argued that the Labour Party had to reconnect with British Muslims, arguing that it had lost the trust of this community as a result of the Iraq War. He also said that British Muslims had their own part to play in reconnecting with politicians, arguing that they needed to rid themselves of a victim mentality and take greater responsibility for their own community. In the House of Commons in January 2009, Khan criticised Pope Benedict XVI for the rehabilitation of Bishop Richard Williamson following his remarks about the Holocaust, a move he described as "highly unsavoury" and of "great concern".

In June 2009 he was promoted to Minister of State for Transport. In what was believed to be a first for an MP, Khan used his Twitter account to self-announce his promotion.  Though Khan was not a member of the cabinet, he attended meetings for agenda items covering his policy area, thus becoming the first Muslim to attend the British Cabinet. As Transport Minister, Khan supported plans to expand Heathrow Airport with the addition of a third runway.

During this period, Khan served as chairman of the socialist Fabian Society, remaining on its executive committee. In 2009, he won the Jenny Jeger Award (Best Fabian Pamphlet) for his work Fairness not Favours: How to re-connect with British Muslims.

In March 2010, Khan publicly stated that for a second successive year he would not be taking a pay rise as an MP or Minister, declaring "At a time when many people in Tooting and throughout the country are having to accept pay freezes I don't think it's appropriate for MPs to accept a pay rise."

Second and third term: 2010–2016
In 2010, Khan was re-elected as the MP for Tooting, despite a swing against his party of 3.6% and a halving of his previous majority. His campaign in Tooting had been supported by Harris Bokhari, who reportedly used anti-Ahmadiyya sentiment to mobilise Muslim voters at a mosque in Tooting to vote for Khan instead of the Liberal Democrat candidate, Nasser Butt, an Ahmadiyya. In 2019, Bokhari was appointed to join Khan's new Diversity, Equality and Inclusion Advisory Group. In the subsequent Labour leadership election Khan was an early backer of Ed Miliband, becoming his campaign manager. In the wake of Labour's 2010 election defeat, Acting Leader Harriet Harman appointed Khan Shadow Secretary of State for Transport. Khan orchestrated Ed Miliband's successful campaign to become Labour leader, and was appointed to the senior roles of Shadow Lord Chancellor and Shadow Justice Secretary.

In April 2010 it was revealed that Khan had repaid falsely claimed expenses on two occasions, when literature was sent to his constituents. The first incident concerned letters sent out before the 2010 General Election which were ruled to have the "unintentional effect of promoting his return to office", the second a £2,550 repayment for Christmas, Eid, and birthday cards for constituents, dating back to 2006. Under House of Commons rules, pre-paid envelopes and official stationery can only be used for official parliamentary business. Khan's claim for the greetings cards was initially rejected, but he presented a new invoice no longer identifying the nature of the claim, and this was accepted. Khan attributed the improper claim for the cards to "inexperience" and human error and apologised for breaking the expenses rules.

In early 2013, Miliband appointed Khan as the Shadow Minister for London, a position that he held in addition to his other responsibilities. In December 2013, the Fabian Society published a collection of essays edited by Khan that was titled Our London. Khan was also tasked with overseeing Labour's campaign for the 2014 London local elections, in which the party advanced its control in the city, gaining hold of twenty of the thirty-two boroughs. By this point, there was much talk of Khan making a bid for the London Mayoralty in 2016, when incumbent Mayor Boris Johnson would be stepping down. His options were affected by the outcome of the 2015 general election; if Labour won, then he would be expected to become a government minister, but if they lost then he would be free to pursue the Mayoralty. In December 2015, Khan voted against the Cameron government's plans to expand the bombing of targets in the Islamic State.

Polls had suggested that Labour could be the largest party in a hung parliament following the 2015 general election, but ultimately the Conservatives secured victory. In the vote, Khan was returned for a third term as MP for Tooting, defeating his Conservative rival by 2,842 votes. He was one of 36 Labour MPs to nominate Jeremy Corbyn as a candidate in the Labour leadership election of 2015, but has said that he was "no patsy" to Corbyn and would stand up to him. He later stated that he nominated Corbyn to "broaden the debate" but did not then vote for him.

On 9 May 2016, Khan resigned as an MP by his appointment to the ancient office of Crown Steward and Bailiff of The Three Chiltern Hundreds, a customary practice in the UK. This triggered a by-election in Tooting which was held on 16 June 2016.

He is regularly named among the Top 100 London politicians in the London Evening Standards annual poll of the 1,000 most influential Londoners and is an Ambassador for Mosaic Network, an initiative set up by Prince Charles.

Mayor of London
In 2016, Sadiq Khan ran to become the mayor of London and was elected with 57% of the vote. He became just the third ever London Mayor and is London's first Muslim mayor and first ethnic minority mayor. Khan was officially sworn in as Mayor in a multi-faith ceremony held in Southwark Cathedral the following day. His first act as mayor was his appearance at a Holocaust memorial ceremony in a rugby stadium in North London, although due to delays with the results of the election, he officially took office on 9 May.

2016 candidacy

Nomination as Labour candidate
After Labour's defeat at the 2015 general election, Khan resigned from the Shadow Cabinet. He then announced himself as a candidate to be the Labour nominee for the London Mayoral elections of 2016. Khan soon gained the support of prominent figures in the party, including former Mayor of London Ken Livingstone, who was on Labour's leftist, socialist wing, and Oona King, who was on its centrist, Blairite wing.  He also received the backing of the Labour-affiliated GMB and Unite unions, and the nomination of 44 of Labour's 73 parliamentary constituent parties in London, leaving him as one of the top two contenders.

Khan's main rival was Conservative candidate Zac Goldsmith; Khan described him as a spoiled dilettante who "never finishes anything he starts". A YouGov poll for LBC suggested that while the other main contender to be the Labour nominee, Tessa Jowell, would defeat Goldsmith in a mayoral election, Khan would not. In hustings, Khan placed an emphasis on his working-class origins, which would play against Jowell's wealthier upbringing, and argued for the need for change in London, thereby insinuating that Jowell would represent too much continuity with the outgoing Johnson administration. In September 2015, Khan was announced as the winning nominee. He gained 48,152 votes (58.9%) against Jowell's 35,573 (41.1%). He was the favourite candidate in all three voting categories; Labour Party members, members of affiliated trade unions and organisations, and registered supporters who had paid £3 in order to vote.

Campaign
Khan vowed that if elected, he would freeze public transport fares in London for four years. He claimed that this would deprive Transport for London (TfL) of £452 million, but TfL stated that it would deprive them of £1.9 billion, taking into account projected population growth over this period. Although he had previously backed Heathrow expansion, he now opposed it, instead calling for expansion at Gatwick Airport. He spoke of clamping down on foreign property investors, and proposed the establishment of both a "London living rent" tenure and a not-for-profit lettings agency that could undercut commercial operators in order to ease the high cost of renting in the city. He also called for house building on land owned by TfL, insisting that at least 50% of those constructed should be "genuinely affordable".

A YouGov poll found that 31% of Londoners stated that they would not be "comfortable" with a Muslim mayor. He declared his opposition to homophobia, and said that he would have "zero tolerance for anti-Semitism". He openly condemned Islamic extremism and called on the Muslim community to take a leading role in combating it, although at the same time acknowledged the Islamophobia that many British Muslims faced. Khan declared that he would be "the most pro-business mayor ever", and met with groups such as the Federation of Small Businesses and City of London Corporation. Goldsmith's Conservative campaign emphasised connections between Khan and then Labour leader Jeremy Corbyn. Both the Conservative campaign and several Conservative-aligned newspapers were accused of tarring Khan as an apologist for, or even sympathiser with, Islamic extremism.

International press sources often focused on his religious identity, with many right-wing American media outlets reacting with horror at his election.

Khan won the election with 57% of the vote. The 1.3 million votes he received are the largest any UK politician has personally received to date. Various press sources noted that Khan's election made him the first actively affiliated Muslim to become mayor of a major Western capital.

Re-election 
After the 2019 United Kingdom general election, following the resignation of Jeremy Corbyn as the leader of the Labour Party, there were some speculations on whether Khan could run in the triggered leadership election. However, he ruled himself out of the leadership election, to run for a second term as mayor of London, which he explained he was 'absolutely' more interested in. In the 2021 London mayoral election, Khan was re-elected for a second term, defeating the Conservative candidate Shaun Bailey. It is expected that he will continue to serve as Mayor until at least 2024.

Mayoralty

In August 2016, Khan declared his support for Owen Smith's failed bid to oust Jeremy Corbyn as Leader of the Labour Party. Although describing him as a "principled Labour man", Khan said that Corbyn had failed to gain popularity with the electorate and that Labour would not win a general election under Corbyn's leadership.

On 8 January 2021, Khan announced a planned council tax rise of 9.5% to help fund policing and free transport for pensioners and schoolchildren in London. Mr Khan's proposal would see an overall increase of 9.5% or £31.59 a year for an average Band D council tax payer. Since his first budget in 2017–18, Mr Khan has increased the Greater London Authority's council tax precept by 31%, from £280 a year to £363.66 a year for a Band D property. On the same day, Khan also ordered London residents to cease travelling after he declared the COVID-19 crisis in London a "major incident" with "out of control" spread, as infection rates for London were estimated to be around 1 in 30, with highs of 1 in 20 in some parts of the city.

European Union and Brexit
In the buildup to the referendum on the UK's continuing membership of the European Union (EU), Khan was a vocal supporter of the "Remain" camp. He agreed to attend a Britain Stronger in Europe campaign event with the Conservative Prime Minister David Cameron to demonstrate cross-party support for remaining within the EU, for which he was criticised by Labour Shadow Chancellor John McDonnell, who claimed that sharing a platform with the Conservatives "discredits us". After the murder of MP Jo Cox during the campaign, Khan called for the country to "pause and reflect" on the manner in which the Leave and Remain camps had been approaching the debate, stating that it had been marred by a "climate of hatred, of poison, of negativity, of cynicism". Following the success of the "Leave" vote, Khan insisted that all EU citizens living in London were welcome in the city and that he was grateful for the contribution that they made to it. He endorsed the Metropolitan Police's "We Stand Together" campaign to combat the rise in racial abuse following the referendum, and later backed the "London is Open" campaign to encourage businesses, artists, and performers to continue coming to the city despite Brexit.

On 20 October 2018, Khan marched with People's Vote protestors from Park Lane to Parliament Square in support of a referendum on the final Brexit deal. The march was started by Khan and featured speeches by Delia Smith and Steve Coogan. The organisers of the march said that almost 700,000 people took part. Police stated that they were unable to estimate the numbers involved and a later police debriefing document prepared by Khan's Greater London Authority estimated the number to be 250,000.

On 23 March 2019, Khan took part in the Put It to the People march in London in support of a second Brexit referendum. Khan addressed a rally at the end of the march alongside SNP leader Nicola Sturgeon, Conservative peer Michael Heseltine, former Attorney General Dominic Grieve, Labour's deputy leader Tom Watson, and MPs Jess Phillips, Justine Greening and David Lammy.

In January 2023, Khan said that he couldn't ignore the immense damage caused by Brexit, arguing for a more sensible approach to mitigate the damage, including a debate on rejoining the single market. He also believed that Brexit had "weakened our economy, fractured our union and diminished our reputation. But, crucially, not beyond repair."

Diversity issues

While fasting for the Islamic holy month of Ramadan in 2016, Khan declared that he would use the period as an opportunity to help "break down the mystique and suspicion" surrounding Islam in Britain and help to "get out there and build bridges" between communities, organising iftars to be held at synagogues, churches, and mosques. He then appeared at a Trafalgar Square celebration of Eid al-Fitr, endorsing religious freedom and lambasting "criminals who do bad things and use the name of Islam to justify what they do". Following the 2016 Orlando nightclub shooting, Khan attended a vigil in Old Compton Street, Soho, and insisted that he "will do everything in [his] power to ensure that LGBT Londoners feel safe in every part of our city"; later that month he marched in the LGBT Pride London parade.

In June 2020, during the George Floyd protests in the United Kingdom, protesters sprayed graffiti on the Statue of Winston Churchill, Parliament Square over two successive days, including, following the inscription "Churchill", the words "was a racist". As a result, Khan controversially announced that he had ordered the statue to be temporarily covered up to preserve it from further vandalism.

On 9 June 2020, in response to the unrest, Khan said that he believed some statues of slavers in London "should be taken down", and established the Commission for Diversity in the Public Realm. The commission has been tasked with reviewing London's statues, street names, monuments, sculptures, artworks and other landmarks, with the potential for removal. The commission is in response to the anti-racist protests which saw protesters topple a Statue of Edward Colston in Bristol, whilst also defacing a number of statues across the country. That evening the statue of Robert Milligan, a merchant and slave trader, outside the Museum of London Docklands was removed by the local authority and the Canal & River Trust.

On 11 June 2020, a joint statement from the Guy's and St Thomas' NHS Foundation Trust announced that the Statue of Robert Clayton, together with that of Thomas Guy, would be removed from public view and that they would work with Khan on the issue.

Transport policies
On transport, Khan immediately announced the introduction of a "Hopper" bus ticket which would allow a passenger to take two bus and tram journeys within an hour for the price of one; it was intended to benefit those on low incomes most. In January 2018, this system was upgraded to offer unlimited journeys and allowing travel on Tube or rail services in between. In June 2016, Khan announced that his electoral pledge to prevent transport fare rises would only apply to "single fares" and pay as you go fares, and not daily, monthly, weekly, or yearly railcards; he was widely criticised for this. That same month, he ordered TfL to ban any advertising on its network that was deemed to body shame or demean women. In July he urged the government to allow TfL to take control of the failing Southern rail service, and in August launched the 24-hour Night Tube service on Fridays and Saturdays, an idea initially proposed by Johnson.

Khan backed expansion of London City Airport, removing the block on this instituted by Johnson's administration; environmentalist campaigners like Siân Berry stated that this was a breach of Khan's pledge to be London's "greenest ever" mayor.
Opposing expansion at Heathrow Airport, he urged Prime Minister Theresa May to instead support expansion at Gatwick Airport, stating that to do so would bring "substantial economic benefits" to London.

In August 2020, Khan announced that Crossrail, a project to create the new Elizabeth line east–west rail link through the centre of London, had been delayed again until 2022, requiring an additional £1.1 billion in funding to complete the project. The line was originally due to open in 2018

COVID-19 pandemic and government bailout

During the COVID-19 pandemic in 2020, Khan was criticized for closing stations and reducing services on the tube network resulting in overcrowding and putting key workers travelling to work at risk. On 17 March 2020 Khan announced the London Underground would begin running a reduced service due to the virus. Khan shut down the Waterloo & City line, several tube stations and the Night Tube. From 20 March, 40 tube stations were closed.

Khan was the first British political leader to call for face masks to be worn in public in April 2020. On 22 April, Khan warned that TfL could run out of money to pay staff by the end of April unless Boris Johnson's government stepped in. Two days later, TfL announced it was furloughing around 7,000 employees, about a quarter of its staff, to help mitigate a 90% reduction in fare revenues.

On 7 May, Transport for London, the capital's transport authority which Khan chairs, requested a £2 billion government bail-out to keep services running until September 2020. Without an agreement with the government, deputy mayor for transport Heidi Alexander said TfL might have to issue a "Section 114 notice" – the equivalent of a public body going bust. On 14 May, Khan and UK Government agreed a £1.6 billion emergency funding package to keep Tube and bus services running. To achieve the bailout package, Khan had raise TfL fares by 1% above inflation, which went against a pledge he made during his mayoral election campaign to not increase fares. Transport Secretary Grant Shapps MP blamed Khan for the "poor condition of TfL’s financial position" during his four years as Mayor.

From 22 June 2020, Khan has implemented an increase in the London Congestion Charge to £15 a day, from £11.50. Its hours of operation have also been extended to 7am – 10pm every day, including weekends. Despite the COVID-19 pandemic, teachers, police officers, firefighters and transport workers are also included in the charge, despite a campaign by the Metropolitan Police Federation to exempt them.

Khan began discussing with local leaders plans for further restrictions in London in late September 2020, and delivered a plan to the central government to introduce measures to curb the worsening outbreak and called for a "circuit-breaker lockdown" of London on 13 October 2020, citing advice from SAGE. The plan was not used; a second national lockdown was not introduced until 31 October. He declared a "major incident" due to a need for emergency coordination to mitigate the major strain on London's healthcare system in January 2021.

According to polling in March 2021, 42% of Londoners agreed that Khan had handled COVID-19 "well", and 39% "badly".

In July 2021, Khan maintained a face mask requirement on London transport, despite the government removing the requirement nationwide, citing the risk of virus transmission. He later expressed frustration at the subsequent fall in compliance and TfL staff's inability to enforce these rules, and said he would lobby the government to introduce legal backing for the rule.

Housing policies
In his first weeks as Mayor, Khan criticised foreign investors for treating homes in London as "gold bricks for investment", instead urging them to invest in the construction of "affordable homes" for Londoners through a new agency, Homes for Londoners, which would be funded by both public and private money. Homes for Londoners is governed by a board and chaired by Khan.
However, in contrast to one of his pre-election statements, he revealed that he no longer supported rent freezes in the city. By 2022, Khan had reverted to supporting rent freezes. 

Khan vetoed the construction of a football stadium and two blocks of flats on Green Belt land in Chislehurst, after the plan had already been supported by Bromley Council, insisting that he would "oppose building on the Green Belt, which is now even more important than when it was created".

Khan launched a "No Nights Sleeping Rough" taskforce to tackle youth homelessness in London in October 2016.

Air pollution 

Khan has called air pollution “the biggest public health emergency of a generation.” In October 2017, he introduced the Toxicity Charge (T-charge); operating within the same hours and zone as the London congestion charge, the T-Charge levied a £10 fine on top of that for older and more polluting vehicles (typically diesel and petrol ones registered before 2006) that do not meet Euro 4 standards. In that same year, he announced plans to establish a replacement: an "Ultra Low Emission Zone (ULEZ)"  that would charge owners of the most polluting cars a fine of £12.50 per day on top of the congestion charge. The all day, every day (except on Christmas Day) zone was introduced in 2019 in Central London, extended to the North and South Circulars in 2021, and will be extended to the whole of Greater London from 2023. The charge applies to diesel cars and vans whose engines aren't at the latest Euro 6 standard as well as most petrol cars pre-2005; in addition, non-compliant buses, coaches and lorries must pay £100. The initial zone resulted in a drop of the worst polluting vehicles entering the zone each day from 35,578 in March 2019 to 26,195 in April after the charge was introduced.

Khan criticised the UK government in June 2017 for its lack of drive in improving general air quality. He stated that the government's action plan on the issue lacked “serious detail, fails to tackle all emission sources, such as from buildings, construction or the river, and does not utilise the government’s full resources and powers”, reflecting its low prioritisation of the issue in the past.

In September, he announced that the first 50 air quality audits for primary schools in the worst-polluted areas of the city had been launched with the objective to reduce air pollution around public schools. The audits will continue until the end of 2017, with reports being published in 2018.

Khan plans to construct a tunnel under the Thames in Greenwich, the Silvertown Tunnel, something which his office claims is needed to relieve traffic congestion. However, environmentalists say it will induce more demand and lead to worsening air quality and car dependency, leading the Green Party, Liberal Democrats, some Conservatives, and even some Labour MPs and mayors to come out against the project. In July 2021, the London Labour regional conference called for the tunnel to be scrapped, by 74% to 26%.

Crime and policing
Since Khan became Mayor, crime rates in London have been increasing in every reporting year, whereby London is currently "experiencing an upsurge in serious violent crime, particularly among teenagers and young men". In figures released by the Office for National Statistics (ONS), crime in London was five times higher than the rest of the United Kingdom in 2019. Killings using a blade saw a 28 percent increase from 67 in 2018 to 86 in 2019.

While knife crime in London fell for three years in a row, down from 14,159 in 2010–2011 to 9,680 in 2014–15, under Boris Johnson, Khan's predecessor as Mayor of London, Khan has presided over an increase in knife crime to 12,061 offences in 2016–17 and 14,695 in 2017–18.

In an interview with LBC, Khan accepted responsibility for rising crime in London as the Police and Crime Commissioner for the city, but blamed budgetary cuts by the UK Conservative Government. Khan stated that knife crime is "rising across England & Wales" and that it is "clearly a national problem that requires national solutions."  Following the 2019 London Bridge stabbing Khan stated, “You can’t disaggregate terrorism and security from cuts made to resources of the police, of probation, the tools that judges have … The key thing is we need to support the police and security service. (...) The point I am making is we can be safer, with more police and more resources.”

Whilst Khan has been Mayor, London's murder rate is at a ten-year high. The Metropolitan police recorded 149 homicides in 2019 up to 30 December. In five years the homicide rate has increased by more than 50%, from 94 cases in 2014.

Political image and views
Writing for The Spectator, the political commentator Nick Cohen described Khan as a centre-left social democrat, while the journalist Amol Rajan termed him "a torch-bearer for the social democratic wing" of the Labour Party. The BBC describe Khan as being located on the party's soft left. In an article for Al Jazeera, the Marxist commentator Richard Seymour described Khan as a centrist, while Matt Wrack, the General Secretary of the Fire Brigades Union, characterised Khan as belonging to "that part of the Labour Party that was in government under Blair and Brown". The journalist Dave Hill described Khan as a social liberal.

Khan has described himself as a "proud feminist". In April 2019, Khan joined the Jewish Labour Movement. He criticised the Trump administration's decision to recognise Jerusalem as the capital of Israel. Khan said the British government should apologise for the Jallianwala Bagh massacre in British-ruled India. Khan condemned the plans for a protest march against Narendra Modi's government over India's treatment of Kashmir during the Hindu festival of Deepavali.

Khan quotes from the Quran and hadith when discussing terrorism. He received death threats from Islamic extremists after voting in favour of the Marriage (Same Sex Couples) Act. He was also threatened by the far-right group Britain First, which in 2016 threatened to take "direct action" against Khan where he "lives, works and prays" as part of an anti-Muslim campaign.

Journalist Dave Hill has said that Khan was "savvy, streetwise and not averse to a scrap", whilst also describing him as having a "joshing, livewire off-stage personality" which differed from the formal image he often projected while onstage.
Khan used to perform stand-up comedy before running for Mayor, including a ten-minute money-raising Stand Up for Labour routine. Comedian Arthur Smith stated that Khan could become a "good club-level comedian one day". During the 2016 Mayoral campaign, Goldsmith referred to Khan as "a caricature machine politician... the sort of politician who justified peoples' mistrust in politics", as evidence citing Khan's U-turn on supporting Heathrow expansion.
Another rival in the 2016 Mayoral campaign, George Galloway of the Respect Party, referred to Khan as a "flip-flop merchant" and a "product of the Blairite machine".

There has been an ongoing political feud between Khan and former US president Donald Trump since 2016, when Khan criticised Trump over his proposed "Muslim ban" and Trump responded by attacking Khan a number of times on Twitter over the next several years. Shortly before Trump's 2019 state visit to the UK, Khan compared Trump to "European dictators of the 1930s and 40s". Upon arrival, Trump responded on Twitter by calling him a "stone-cold loser" and comparing him to another mayor he also targets, Bill de Blasio.

On 9 June 2020, Khan said that he believed some statues of slavers in London "should be taken down", and established the Commission for Diversity in the Public Realm to do so.

Awards
In 2009, he became a  Member of Her Majesty's Most Honourable Privy Council. This entitled him to the honorific "The Right Honourable" for life.
 Six months after his election as the MP for Tooting, The Spectator awarded Khan Newcomer of the Year.
 Khan was nominated for the Politician of the Year Award at the British Muslim Awards in January 2013 and 2015 and won the award in February 2016.
 In late 2016 and 2017, Khan won and accepted the British GQ’s Politician of the Year Award.
 In 2017, he was awarded an Honorary Doctorate from the University of Law.
 In 2018, Khan was conferred Sitara-e-Pakistan for his services to Pakistan by the Pakistani President Mamnoon Hussain.
 In 2018, he became an Honorary Fellow of the Royal Institute of British Architects.
 In 2019, Khan became an Honorary Bencher of Middle Temple Inn.

Personal life
Khan is a practising Muslim who observes the fast during Ramadan and regularly attends Al-Muzzammil Mosque in Tooting. Journalist Dave Hill described Khan as "a moderate, socially liberal Muslim". Khan has expressed the view that "too often the people who are 'representing' the Islamic faith aren't representative, they're angry men with beards. And that is not what Islam is about."

Khan married Saadiya Ahmed, a fellow solicitor, in 1994. They have two daughters, both raised in the Islamic faith. He is a supporter of Liverpool F.C.

See also
 2016 London mayoral election
 List of British Pakistanis

References

Sources

External links

 
 Sadiq Khan – Labour Candidate for Mayor of London official site

|-

|-

|-

|-

|-

|-

|-

1970 births
Living people
Alumni of London Metropolitan University
Alumni of the University of North London
Alumni of The University of Law
British lawyers of Pakistani descent
British politicians of Pakistani descent
British politicians of Indian descent
British social democrats
Councillors in the London Borough of Wandsworth
English Muslims
English people of Pakistani descent
English people of Indian descent
English feminists
Male feminists
Proponents of Islamic feminism
Labour Party (UK) mayors
Labour Party (UK) MPs for English constituencies
Mayors of London
Members of the Privy Council of the United Kingdom
People from Tooting
Muhajir people
People educated at Ernest Bevin College
UK MPs 2005–2010
UK MPs 2010–2015
UK MPs 2015–2017
Chairs of the Fabian Society
Recipients of the Sitara-e-Pakistan
Fellows of the Royal Institute of British Architects